Gábor Ocskay, Jr. (11 September 1975 – 24 March 2009) was a Hungarian ice hockey player. As the center of the first line, he played a huge part in his national team's promotion to the 2009 World Championship. He died of a heart attack weeks before the start of the 2009 Championships. Ocskay was posthumously awarded the Torriani Award by the International Ice Hockey Federation in 2016.

Domestic career

Ocskay was born in Budapest, but spent his childhood in Székesfehérvár, Fejér county and during his entire career he played for Alba Volán Székesfehérvár. Officially he has been a member of the club since 1983 and that time he has started to develop a famed on-ice relationship with right winger Krisztián Palkovics. Among hockey fans in Hungary the pair was just known as "The Twins".

Started to play regularly in the Hungarian First Division in the 1993-94 season and won the championship nine times, the last seven being consecutive. After long-time captain, Balázs Kangyal has left the team, he became his successor, but due to some difficulties at the end of the 2008-09 EBEL regular season, he decided to give up this position. However, he has been the real spiritual leader of the team for a long time.

International play

He won 187 caps for the Hungarian national team and since 1993 he has played in every single World Championship for them. With him the team won the Pool C (now Division II) tournament in 1998 and 2000, and by winning the 2008 Division I tournament in Sapporo, Japan, it gained promotion to the highest level of the World Championship for the first time since 1939.

Death
In 2004, he was diagnosed with a heart disease and sidelined for four months, but later has received a medical permission to continue his career. He died of a heart attack in Budapest late on 24 March 2009, aged 33, three days after helping his side win its tenth Hungarian title.

After the shocking news of his death, both his club and the Hungarian Federation has decided to retire his famous #19 jersey from their teams. On the day of his funeral, the ice hall of Székesfehérvár has been named after him. Ice hockey fans around the country have started to raise money to build a statue for him in front of the entrance of the ice hall.

Awards

Hungarian Player of the Year
1994, 1995 and 2006

Best Scorer of the Hungarian First Division
1994-95, 1997-98, 1998-99

Best Forward of the Hungarian First Division
1993-94, 2006-07

 Torriani Award (IIHF)
 2016

See also
List of ice hockey players who died during their playing career

References

External links 

1975 births
2009 deaths
Fehérvár AV19 players
Hungarian ice hockey centres
Ice hockey people from Budapest
Torriani Award recipients